K-1 Grand Prix '99 Final Round was a martial arts event promoted by the K-1 organization. It was the seventh K-1 World Grand Prix final involving eight of the world's best fighters, with all bouts fought under K-1 Rules. The eight finalists had all qualified via elimination fights at the K-1 World Grand Prix '99 Opening Round. Also on the card was a number of 'Freshman Fights' and an 'Opening Fight' fought under a mixture of Jiu-Jitsu and K-1 Rules (various weight class) and two 'Super Fights' fought under K-1 Rules (various weight classes). In total there were twenty fighters at the event, representing eight countries.

The tournament winner was Ernesto Hoost who defeated Mirko Cro Cop in the final by third round knockout. This victory was Hoost's second of four K-1 Grand Prix wins, while Cro Cop was making his first and penultimate K-1 Grand Prix Final appearance before winning it 14 years later. He would later branch out to a successful career in MMA in Pride. The event was held at the Tokyo Dome in Tokyo, Japan on Sunday, December 5, 1999 in front of a huge crowd of 58,200 spectators.

K-1 Grand Prix '99 Final Round Tournament

Results

See also
List of K-1 events
List of male kickboxers

References

External links
K-1 Official Website
K-1sport.de - Your Source for Everything K-1

K-1 events
1999 in kickboxing
Kickboxing in Japan
Sports competitions in Tokyo